Delta University may refer to:

 Delta University for Science and Technology, Mansoura, Egypt
 Delta International University of New Orleans, Louisiana
 Delta State Polytechnic, Delta, Nigeria, a set of three public institutions
 Delta State University, Abraka, Delta, Nigeria, state government university
 Delta State University, Cleveland, Mississippi
 East Delta University, Agrabad, Chittagong, Bangladesh
 Western Delta University, Oghara, Delta State, Nigeria

See also
 Delta College (disambiguation)
 Delta State (disambiguation)
 Delta (disambiguation)